Isabel Blanco (born 10 May 1979 in Bergen) is a Norwegian handball player of Galician descent.

Club career
Blanco has previously played for the clubs Kjøkkelvik, Vadmyra, Nordnes, Tertnes HE, Club El Ferrobus Mislata, Aalborg DH, FC Midtjylland, Larvik HK and Molde Elite.  She earned a silver medal in the 2005 and 2008 Danish championships, and a bronze medal in 2006, when she was voted Pivot of the Year in the Danish league.

National team
She won a gold medal at the  2004 European Women's Handball Championship with the Norwegian national team and again at the 2008 European Women's Handball Championship.

Personal life
Blanco was born in Bergen. Her father is Fernando Blanco Jiménez, a Spanish-Galician and former Deportivo de La Coruña football player. She has not lived in Spain except for the one year at Club El Ferrobus Mislata.

Blanco is an avid painter and photographer, and has stated on numerous occasions that she would like to pursue them as a career when she is done with handball. Blanco has her own website where she sells her paintings.

References

External links

1979 births
Living people
Norwegian female handball players
Norwegian expatriate sportspeople in Denmark
Norwegian expatriate sportspeople in Spain
Expatriate handball players
Sportspeople from Bergen
Norwegian people of Spanish descent